Kraussia speciosa is a species of plant in the family Rubiaceae. It is found in coastal Kenya and Tanzania, where it is associated with the Zanzibar-Inhambane regional mosaic.

Sources

 

speciosa
Vulnerable plants
Taxonomy articles created by Polbot